Mari Eulanda Morrow (born July 21, 1968) is an American film and television actress, model and realtor.  Morrow is best known for her roles as Rachel Gannon on the ABC daytime soap opera One Life to Live (1994–96), Oneisha Savoy on the ABC/CBS sitcom Family Matters (1992–97), and Desiree "Des" Littlejohn on the UPN sitcom The Parkers (1999). Morrow also starred in featured films such as Def Jam's How to Be a Player (1997), Uninvited Guest (2000) and Traci Townsend (2006).

Biography

Early life and education
Born and raised in Miami, Florida, Morrow is of Barbadian and African-American descent. Morrow began acting as a child in theater productions to help raise funds for low-income college students. Morrow attended North Miami Senior High School, graduating in 1986. After high school, Morrow attended New York University's Tisch School of the Arts where she majored in dance and theater.

Career
Morrow made her television debut appearance in 1992 as Wendy Mallow on the popular television program, Baywatch. From 1995 to 1996, Morrow portrayed Rachel Gannon on the ABC soap opera One Life to Live. Morrow also had a recurring appearance on the sitcom, Family Matters as Darius McCrary (Eddie)'s girlfriend and then ex-girlfriend, Oneisha, from 1992 to 1997. Other television appearances include, Living Single, Soul Food, Conan, 3rd Rock from the Sun, The Parkers, In The House, The Fresh Prince of Bel-Air, and The Jamie Foxx Show Morrow has film roles in: Dead Man on Campus, Uninvited Guest, Children of the Corn III: Urban Harvest, Book of Love, Restraining Order, Def Jam's How to Be a Player, Traci Townsend, National Security, and Today You Die.

Personal life
Morrow has been married once and has two children. Morrow married businessman Carl Johnson in 1994, but divorced in 1997. She has two sons, Robert (born August 3, 2000) and Ari (born February 2016). Aside from her acting career, Morrow is also a real estate agent in Los Angeles, California.

Filmography

Film/Movie

Television

References

External links

 

1968 births
20th-century American actresses
21st-century American actresses
African-American actresses
American film actresses
American television actresses
Actresses from Miami
Living people
Tisch School of the Arts alumni